Anton Andrew Karl (April 8, 1914 – April 8, 1989) was a professional baseball player. He was a right-handed pitcher over parts of five seasons (1943–47) with the Boston Red Sox, Philadelphia Phillies and Boston Braves. For his career, he compiled an 18–23 record in 191 appearances, all but four as a relief pitcher, with a 3.51 earned run average and 107 strikeouts.

An alumnus of Manhattan College, Karl was born in Mount Vernon, New York and later died in La Jolla, California on his 75th birthday.

See also
List of Major League Baseball annual saves leaders

References

External links

1914 births
1989 deaths
Major League Baseball pitchers
Baseball players from New York (state)
Boston Red Sox players
Philadelphia Phillies players
Boston Braves players
Manhattan Jaspers baseball players